This is a list memorials to Andrew Jackson, the 7th president of the United States.

Cities, towns, and villages
Hermitage, Pennsylvania (formerly Hickory Township), after his homestead
Hermitage, Tennessee, after his homestead
Jackson, Alabama
Jacksonville, Alabama
Jackson, Kentucky
Jackson, Louisiana
Jackson, Michigan
Jackson, Mississippi
Jackson, Missouri
Jackson, New Hampshire
Jackson, New Jersey
Jackson, Ohio
Jackson, South Carolina
Jackson, Tennessee
Jackson Township, Indiana, a list of 47 different townships of that name

Jacksontown, Ohio in Licking County, Ohio
Jacksonville, Florida
Jacksonville, Illinois
Jacksonville, North Carolina
Mount Jackson, Virginia
Old Hickory, Tennessee, after his nickname

Counties
Hickory County, Missouri, after his nickname, "Old Hickory"
Jackson County, Alabama
Jackson County, Arkansas
Jackson County, Colorado
Jackson County, Florida
Jackson County, Illinois
Jackson County, Indiana
Jackson County, Iowa
Jackson County, Kansas
Jackson County, Kentucky
Jackson Parish, Louisiana
Jackson County, Michigan
Jackson County, Mississippi
Jackson County, Missouri
Jackson County, North Carolina
Jackson County, Ohio
Jackson County, Oklahoma
Jackson County, Oregon
Jackson County, Tennessee
Jackson County, Texas
Jackson County, West Virginia
Jackson County, Wisconsin

Educational institutions
Andrew Jackson Elementary School (Old Hickory, Tennessee)
Andrew Jackson High School (South Carolina)
Andrew Jackson High School (Jacksonville, Florida)
Andrew Jackson High School (Cambria Heights, New York), Queens, New York City, New York
Miami Jackson High School, Miami, Florida
Andrew Jackson Language Academy, Chicago, Illinois
Andrew Jackson Middle School (Cross Lanes, West Virginia)
Andrew Jackson Middle School (South Carolina)
Andrew Jackson Middle School (Titusville, Florida)
Andrew Jackson Middle School (Albuquerque, New Mexico)
Andrew Jackson Fundamental Magnet High School, Chalmette, Louisiana
Andrew Jackson Academy, Forrestville, Maryland
Andrew Jackson Public School 24Q (Flushing, New York),  Queens, New York City, New York

Military vessels
The United States revenue cutter Jackson, commissioned in 1832.
USS President Jackson in service 1941–1955.
USS Andrew Jackson (SSBN-619),  in commission in 1963–1989.

Statues
 Four identical equestrian statues by the sculptor Clark Mills: in Lafayette Square, Washington, D.C.; in Jackson Square, New Orleans; in Nashville on the grounds of the Tennessee State Capitol; and in Jacksonville, Florida 
 A statue to Jackson exists on the State Capitol grounds of Raleigh, North Carolina. That statue controversially identifies him as one of the "presidents North Carolina gave the nation," and he is featured alongside James Polk and Andrew Johnson, both U.S. presidents born in North Carolina. 
 There is a bust of Jackson in Plaza Ferdinand VII in Pensacola, Florida, where he became the first governor of the Florida Territory in 1821.
 Bronze sculpture of Andrew Jackson by Belle Kinney Scholz and Leopold Scholz in the U.S. Capitol Building as part of the National Statuary Hall Collection
 Statue of Jackson on a horse in front of the Jackson County Courthouse in Kansas City, Missouri, erected in 1934.

Parks
Andrew Jackson State Park, South Carolina
Jackson Park, Chicago
Jackson Park, Seattle
Jackson Park, Alameda, CA was denamed in July 2020; renamed to Chochenyo Park in January 2021

Other
Andrew Jackson Centre, Northern Ireland
Andrew Jackson Masonic Lodge No. 120, in the Jurisdiction of Virginia
Andrew Jackson Station (Post Office), Rolando, San Diego.
Fort Jackson, the U.S. Army's largest training base
Fort Jackson, on the lower Mississippi River
Jackson Avenue, New Orleans
Jackson Barracks, New Orleans
Jackson Square, New Orleans
Old Hickory Boulevard, Tennessee
Old Hickory Lake, Tennessee
Andrew Jackson State Office Building, in Nashville, completed in 1969

Portrayal on banknotes and stamps

Jackson has appeared on U.S. banknotes as far back as 1869, and extending into the 21st century. His image has appeared on the $5, $10, $20, and $10,000 note. Most recently, his image has appeared on the U.S. $20 Federal reserve note beginning in 1928. In 2016, Treasury Secretary Jack Lew announced his goal that by 2020 an image of Harriet Tubman would replace Jackson's depiction on the front side of the $20 banknote, and that an image of Jackson would be placed on the reverse side, though the final decision will be made by his successors.

Jackson has appeared on several postage stamps. He first appeared on an 1863 two-cent stamp, which is commonly referred to by collectors as the Black Jack due to the large portraiture of Jackson on its face printed in pitch black. During the American Civil War, the Confederate government issued two Confederate postage stamps bearing Jackson's portrait.

Popular culture depictions
Jackson and his wife Rachel were the main subjects of a 1951 historical novel by Irving Stone, The President's Lady, which told the story of their lives up until Rachel's death. The novel was the basis for the 1953 film of the same name starring Charlton Heston as Jackson and Susan Hayward as Rachel.

Jackson has been a supporting character in a number of historical films and television productions. Lionel Barrymore played Jackson in The Gorgeous Hussy (1936), a fictionalized biography of Peggy Eaton starring Joan Crawford. The Buccaneer (1938), depicting the Battle of New Orleans, included Hugh Sothern as Jackson, and was remade in 1958 with Heston again playing Jackson.
Brian Donlevy played Jackson in the Paramount Pictures 1942 film The Remarkable Andrew. Basil Ruysdael played Jackson in Walt Disney's 1955 Davy Crockett TV miniseries.

Jackson is the protagonist of the comedic historic rock musical Bloody Bloody Andrew Jackson (2008) with music and lyrics by Michael Friedman and book by Alex Timbers.

See also
 List of presidents of the United States on currency
 Presidents of the United States on U.S. postage stamps
 Presidential memorials in the United States

References

Jackson, Andrew

Bibliography